Elmira Syzdykova (born  5 February 1992) is a Kazakh wrestler. She represented her country at the 2016 Summer Olympics and won a bronze medal in the 69 kg category. She has won several medals at the Asian Championships.

In 2021, she won one of the bronze medals in the 76 kg event at the Matteo Pellicone Ranking Series 2021 held in Rome, Italy. A month later, she secured the gold medal in her event at the 2021 Asian Wrestling Championships held in Almaty, Kazakhstan.

In 2022, she won the gold medal in the women's 76 kg event at the Golden Grand Prix Ivan Yarygin held in Krasnoyarsk, Russia.

She won the gold medal in the women's 76kg event at the Grand Prix de France Henri Deglane 2023 held in Nice, France. She won one of the bronze medals in her event at the 2023 Ibrahim Moustafa Tournament held in Alexandria, Egypt.

Achievements

References

External links
 

1992 births
Living people
Kazakhstani female sport wrestlers
Wrestlers at the 2016 Summer Olympics
Olympic wrestlers of Kazakhstan
Olympic bronze medalists for Kazakhstan
Olympic medalists in wrestling
Medalists at the 2016 Summer Olympics
Wrestlers at the 2018 Asian Games
Asian Games medalists in wrestling
Medalists at the 2018 Asian Games
Asian Games bronze medalists for Kazakhstan
Asian Wrestling Championships medalists
Wrestlers at the 2020 Summer Olympics
21st-century Kazakhstani women